Kelly Thornton (born 13 April 1997) is an Irish actress who began her career as a child actress. She is best known for her roles as Corrina Mallon in the 2015 RTÉ drama Clean Break and Emma in the film Life's a Breeze (2013), which earned her an IFTA nomination for best actress.

Early life and education
Thornton is from Terenure, a suburb in South Dublin and attended St Louis High School, Rathmines. She has a younger sister Robyn. She was discovered when she was 14 whilst shopping on Grafton Street with her friends by a casting director who invited her to audition.

Career
Thornton made her screen debut in the 2013 Irish comedy film Life's a Breeze. She played the role of Emma, the main protagonist, alongside fellow Irish actors Pat Shortt and Fionnula Flanagan. The film was screened in the Contemporary World Cinema section at the 2013 Toronto International Film Festival. Thornton earned an IFTA nomination for her role, as well as receiving the Bingham Ray New Talent Award at the 2013 Galway Film Fleadh.

In late 2013, Thornton made her Irish television debut, featuring in the fourth series of the popular RTÉ Television drama Love/Hate, playing the part of Kellie in a single episode appearance. Her sister Robyn had a guest role in the drama. In 2015, Thornton got her biggest role to date, starring as Corrina Mallon in the four part RTÉ drama Clean Break. The series, directed by Gillies MacKinnon and Damien O’Donnell, told the story of Frank Mallon, Corrina's father and a car dealer. Struggling to make ends meet, Frank kidnaps the family of his local bank manager and consequently finds himself involved with some notorious local criminals. A second series of the show has yet to be announced by RTÉ.

The same year, Thornton played the lead role of Molly in the Irish short film Battle. The film was written and directed by Megan K. Fox and told the story of a "teenager finding strength and happiness in music in the face of her battle with depression". This film would later be the focus of an episode of Beyond the Lens in 2016.

Thornton gained further recognition for her part in the 2016 film Sing Street, playing the role of Ann Lawlor, older sister of the main protagonist Conor. Set in mid-1980s inner-city Dublin, Sing Street follows the story of Conor "Cosmo" Lawlor, a teenager who is forced to move schools, from a private fee-paying school to the non-fee-paying Synge Street CBS.

In October 2016, Thornton featured in the music video for Don't Mind Me by Irish alternative rock band Walking on Cars.

Thornton has since starred in three short films: Inside I'm Racing in 2017, Jack Reynor's Bainne opposite Will Poulter and Ciarán Dooley's Twin, both in 2019.

Filmography

Film

Television

Music  videos

Awards and nominations

References

External links

Living people
1997 births
21st-century Irish actresses
Actresses from County Dublin
Irish film actresses
Irish television actresses
People from South Dublin (county)